2018 Basketbol Süper Ligi (BSL) Playoffs was the final phase of the 2017–18 Basketbol Süper Ligi season. The playoffs started on 22 May 2018. Fenerbahçe Doğuş were the defending champions.

The eight highest placed teams of the regular season qualified for the playoffs. In the quarter-finals a best-of-three was played, in the semi-finals a best-of-five and in the finals a best-of-seven playoff format was used.

Fenerbahçe Doğuş competed against Tofaş in the finals, won the series 4-1 and got their 9th championship.

Bracket

Quarterfinals

Fenerbahçe Doğuş vs. Sakarya BB

Tofaş vs. Eskişehir

Anadolu Efes vs. Darüşşafaka

Beşiktaş Sompo Japan vs. Banvit

Semifinals

Fenerbahçe Doğuş vs. Banvit

Tofaş vs. Anadolu Efes

Finals

Fenerbahçe Doğuş vs. Tofaş

References
TBL.org.tr
TBF.org.tr

Playoff
Turkish Basketball Super League Playoffs